is a distant trans-Neptunian object that was discovered  from the Sun by Scott Sheppard, David Tholen, and Chad Trujillo on 24 March 2020. Announced on 14 February 2021, it is one of the most distant observable known objects in the Solar System.

See also 
List of Solar System objects most distant from the Sun

References

External links 
 
 MPC

Minor planet object articles (unnumbered)

Possible dwarf planets
20200324